Harry Sutherland,  (1922 – 14 February 2006) was a Canadian philatelist who signed the Roll of Distinguished Philatelists in 1991.

References

Canadian philatelists
Signatories to the Roll of Distinguished Philatelists
1922 births
2006 deaths
Canadian King's Counsel